Harvard Business Publishing was founded in 1994 as a not-for-profit, wholly owned subsidiary of Harvard University (distinct from Harvard University Press), with a focus on improving business management practices. The company consists of three market groups: Higher Education, Corporate Learning, and Harvard Business Review Group. It produces print and digital products including Harvard Business Review, Harvard Business Review Press Books, and case briefs, blogs, events and seminars, as well as a variety of online courses such as Harvard ManageMentor and Leadership Direct, frequently used by Harvard Business School and other Business Schools.

References

External links
 Harvard Business Publishing
 Harvard Business School Publishing Course Listings
 Core Curriculum Readings from Harvard Business Publishing

 
1994 establishments in Massachusetts